Donald Hiller Graves (September 11, 1930 – September 28, 2010) was an American author and educator who specialized in the field of writing education.

Early life and education
Donald H. Graves was born in Fall River, Massachusetts. His parents were a nurse and school principal. He earned a Masters in Education from Bridgewater State University. In 1973, Graves completed a doctorate in education at University at Buffalo.

Career 
Graves served in the United States Coast Guard before becoming an elementary school teacher and school principal. He is recognized as an expert in the field of writing education. He pioneered new methods of teaching writing and published 26 books in 25 years, primarily on the topics of teaching and writing. He believed that all children can write, and viewed writing as an important form of self-expression. The National Council of Teachers of English (NCTE) named the Donald H. Graves writing award in his honor. Graves died on September 28, 2010 in Falmouth, Maine.

References

External links

1930 births
2010 deaths
20th-century American male writers
21st-century American male writers
20th-century American educators
21st-century American educators
Schoolteachers from Massachusetts
American school principals
People from Fall River, Massachusetts
Writers from Massachusetts
Bridgewater State University alumni
University at Buffalo alumni
20th-century American writers